Founded in 1937, the Society of the Plastics Industry, Inc. was a professional society representing individuals in the plastics industry. In 2010, the organization began doing business as SPI: The Plastics Industry Trade Association, before changing its name to the Plastics Industry Association (PLASTICS)'. 

PLASTICS members represent the entire plastics industry supply chain in the U.S., including processors, machinery and equipment manufacturers, raw materials suppliers, recyclers and brand owners.

Activities
The organization produces the triennial global trade show NPE, one of the world's largest plastics industry events. PLASTICS also publishes statistical reports on the U.S. plastics industry, including:

 The Size and Impact of the Plastics Industry on the U.S. Economy and
 Global Business Trends.''

PLASTICS' Committee on Equipment Statistics also produces annual and quarterly reports on shipments in plastics manufacturing machinery. As the Society of the Plastics Industry, the organization introduced the Resin Identification Code in 1988 before turning control of the Code over to ASTM International. This system was introduced to make separation of the many similar-appearing plastic resin types easier for plastic recycling centers across the country. There was no federal legislation or program to mandate these symbols, though many states have now adopted legislation that mandate its use.

References

External links
To promote the advancement of plastics machinery manufacturing industry
Custom Plastic Box Design & Manufacture Service
SPI's Triennial Global Trade Show: NPE
Plastics Data Source

Recycling organizations
Plastics industry organizations
Trade associations based in the United States
Advocacy groups in the United States